Samuel Costa may refer to:
Samuel Costa (skier) (born 1992), Italian skier
Samuel Costa (footballer) (born 2000), Portuguese footballer